"Aishiteru" (Japanese: 愛してる; trans. "I Love You") is the 6th single by Mika Nakashima, released for her second studio album Love (2003). The title track was written and composed by H, with additional arrangement handled by Shinya. Billed as a "St. Valentine EP for the Lovers," "Aishiteru" peaked at number four on the weekly Oricon Singles Chart, and was certified gold by the RIAJ for physical shipments of over 200,000 units.

Track listing
CD single
 "Ai Shiteru" (愛してる;  I Love You) – 5:34
 "Marionette" – 5:20
 "The Rose" – 4:33
 "Ai Shiteru" (Jazztronik Mix) – 7:40
 "Ai Shiteru" (Instrumental) – 5:31

Charts and sales

Single charts

Certifications

References

2003 singles
Mika Nakashima songs
2003 songs